Joseph Charles Nemec IV (born November 5, 1971), known professionally as Corin Nemec, is an American actor, producer, and screenwriter. He was billed as Corin "Corky" Nemec or Corky Nemec until 1990.

Nemec is known for playing the title character in FOX sitcom Parker Lewis Can't Lose (1990–93), Jonas Quinn in television series Stargate SG-1, and Harold Lauder in the ABC miniseries The Stand. He is known in India for his role as Allan in Rahul Dholakia's 2007 film Parzania.

Early life
Nemec was born on November 5, 1971. His mother Janis was a graphic artist, as well as a painter, writer, and poet. His father, Joseph Charles Nemec III, is of Czech descent, and works in the film industry as a set designer and production designer. His older sister, Anastacia C. Nemec, works also as an assistant director.

Nemec was inspired to become an actor after watching the children's film The Goonies at the age of 13, for which his father had done the art direction. He also cites his parents' artistic professions as a major influence, and that acting "seemed the right thing to do".

Career

Nemec began training with the Centre Stage LA theater company and signed on with an agent after performing in one of its talent showcases. He was booked for several commercials, such as Suzuki, and eventually landed a guest-spot on the TV show Sidekicks starring Ernie Reyes Jr., with whom Nemec is still friends. His first major film role was Tucker: The Man and His Dream in 1988. He appeared in several TV shows, earning an Emmy nomination for his portrayal of Steven Stayner in the NBC miniseries
I Know My First Name Is Steven. He starred alongside actors Jack Palance, Peter Boyle, and Charlton Heston in the 1990 feature film Solar Crisis.

Nemec played the lead in the TV series Parker Lewis Can't Lose  from 1990 to 1993. Also, in 1993, Nemec was cast as Harold Lauder in a TV adaptation of Stephen King's The Stand. In 1997, he played a notable role in the movie Goodbye, America. He also starred in the TV movies My Brother's Keeper alongside Jeanne Tripplehorn and Blackout with Jane Seymour. Nemec made appearances on several TV shows, including Tales from the Crypt, Smallville, CSI: NY, CSI: Miami, Supernatural, and Ghost Whisperer. He also portrayed the serial killers Richard Speck and Ted Bundy. He played leading parts in some original Sci Fi Channel (United States) made-for-TV movies such as Sea Beast, Mansquito, SS Doomtrooper, Dragon Wasps, and Lake Placid vs. Anaconda and some original movies for Lifetime (TV network).

During the 1990s, Nemec had a brief foray into hip-hop, recording an entire album with the group Starship of Foolz, developed by Matt Robinson and Dedra Tate, and produced by actor Balthazar Getty. Nemec also produced a new comic series that starred Paul Mooney, father of fellow Starship of Foolz member Shane Mooney, as the president of the United States. He also appeared in the music video "Beer for My Horses" by Toby Keith and Willie Nelson.

From 2002 to 2004, he appeared as Jonas Quinn on Stargate SG-1, temporarily replacing Michael Shanks (Daniel Jackson) in the line-up of the SG-1 team.

In January 2013, while working on the film Poseidon Rex, Nemec was involved in a boating accident.  While he was being transported to set aboard a Belize Coast Guard vessel, the boat ran into a semi-submerged barge. The entire right side of his body was shattered; he required multiple blood transfusions to save his life, and he underwent five surgeries.

Personal life
Corin dated Jami Beth Schahn when they were teenagers, and in 1993 they had their first child, Sadie Joy. Corin and Jami married in 2002 and had their second child, Lucas Manu, in 2005. Corin and Jami divorced in 2009 and shared custody of their children. 

Nemec is close friends with actor David Faustino of television sitcom Married... with Children, with whom he has a production company that co-produced the debut album from Austin-based band Hollow featuring Jon Dishongh. Nemec and Faustino co-starred in Star-ving, a web series that spoofs HBO's Entourage.

On September 22nd 2022, the Tampa Bay Times reported Corin was moving to Tampa Bay to begin production on a series of independent films with Scatter Brothers Productions, and met a new girlfriend there.

Filmography

References

External links

Corin Nemec on Instagram [@imcorinnemec]
CorinNemecTV channel on YouTube

1971 births
20th-century American male actors
21st-century American male actors
American male child actors
American male film actors
American male television actors
American people of Czech descent
Male actors from Little Rock, Arkansas
Living people